Phạm Lê Thảo Nguyên (born 7 December 1987) is a Vietnamese chess player, and a woman grandmaster. Since 2013 she is also an International Master. 

She has qualified for the knockout tournament Women's World Chess Championship 2017 as the winner of a zonal stage. In the first two rounds, she won against Lela Javakhishvili and Aleksandra Goryachkina, losing in the third round against Anna Muzychuk. She played for the Vietnamese women's team which won the bronze medal in chess at the 2010 Asian Games.

She has played multiple times for Vietnam's team in Women's Chess Olympiad: in 2008 (Dresden), 2010 (Khanty-Mansiysk), 2012 (Istanbul), 2014 (Tromsø), 2016 (Baku) and 2018 (Batumi).

In 2011 she was member of the Vietnamese women's team that played in the World Team Chess Championship. 

She is married to the Vietnamese chess grandmaster Nguyễn Ngọc Trường Sơn.

References

External links 
 

1987 births
Living people
Vietnamese chess players
Chess woman grandmasters
Asian Games medalists in chess
Asian Games bronze medalists for Vietnam
Chess players at the 2010 Asian Games
Medalists at the 2010 Asian Games
Southeast Asian Games medalists in chess
Southeast Asian Games gold medalists for Vietnam
Competitors at the 2011 Southeast Asian Games
Competitors at the 2021 Southeast Asian Games